Franz Reznicek (born 20 October 1903, date of death unknown) was an Austrian architect. After moving to Bludenz, Vorarlberg, where he initially headed an architectural firm with Alois Dönz, he was responsible for the design of numerous modernist buildings in the area during the 1930s.

Biography and career
Franz Reznicek was born 20 October 1903 in Baden bei Wien. At the age of 12, he  moved to Innsbruck, where three years later he entered the four-year architecture program at the Bundeslehranstalt für Hochbau (National Institute of High-Rise Building). After interning with his instructor, L. Welzenbacher, Reznicek passed his graduation examination at the institute on 13 February 1923.

Following that he continued to work at the Welzenbacher firm as a full associate. In 1926 he transferred to the Innsbruck City building authority, and two years later became head of the Innsbruck Office of Architecture - North, in Bozen (now Bolzano, Italy).

After participating together with Alois Dönz in the Bregenz National Fire Insurance contest, in 1929 Reznicek relocated to Bludenz and opened an architectural firm with Alois Dönz. Finally in 1936 he succeeded in being accepted into the Zentralvereinigung der Architekten Österreichs (Central Association of Austrian Architects), and in 1949 he took a further examination in civil engineering for the Engineering Bureaux of Tyrol and Vorarlberg.

Following Dönz's retirement, Reznicek led the firm for a further five years before he too retired.

Works
 1930: Solleder House, Sankt Anton am Arlberg
 1931: Sauter House, Bludenz
 1932: Tanzcafé Tannberg, Lech am Arlberg
 1933: Illustrated book Architekten A. Dönz / F. Reznicek
 1934: Beck House, Bludenz
 1937: Resch House, Schaan
 1938: Vallaster commercial and residential building, Schruns
 1950: Längle commercial and residential building, Bludenz
 1951: Expansion of Dörflinger Konditorei-Café, Bludenz
 1956: Sparkasse Bludenz (savings bank)
 1962: Obdorf kindergarten, Bludenz
 1964: Winsauer commercial and residential building, Bludenz

Also included in his works are the Tschofen House, the Unterstein community, the Schadler House, and the Plangg and Pfluger workers' housing. His unrealized designs for a produce grading station in Rankweil (1931) and a country house on the Tschengla/Bürserberg and a mountain hotel (both pre-1933) and sketch for a post office in Lech (also pre-1933) are also important.

References

Sources
 Renate Breuß and Claudia Wedekind. "Modernität und Traditionalität im Werk der Architekten Alois Dönz und Franz Reznicek" in Bau Handwerk Kunst: Beiträge zur Architekturgeschichte Vorarlbergs im 20. Jahrhundert Institut für Kunstgeschichte, Universität Innsbruck, 1994 (exhibition catalog)

External links 
 

1903 births
Year of death missing
20th-century Austrian architects
Austrian people of Czech descent
People from Baden bei Wien